

"Rocket Lake-S" (14 nm)

Xeon W-13xx (workstation, uniprocessor) 
 -E: embedded
 -P: high performance (and power), with cTDP down to 95 W
 -T: low power, with cTDP down to 25 W

Xeon E-23xx (server, uniprocessor) 
 Xeon E-2x1x2x3: x1 represents the generation. x3 represents the number of cores.
 No suffix letter: without integrated GPU
 -G: with integrated GPU

References 

 
 

Intel Xeon (Rocket Lake)